FC Nashe Pivo is a Kyrgyzstani football club based in Kant, Kyrgyzstan that played in the second division in Kyrgyzstan. It's a farm club of FC Abdish-Ata Kant.

History 
2003: Founded as FC Abdish-Ata-2 Kant.
20.05.2003: Renamed to FC Nashe Pivo Kant.

Nashe Pivo reached the Kyrgyzstan Cup Final for the first time in 2015, where they were defeated 4-2 by parent club Abdysh-Ata Kant.

Achievements 
Kyrgyzstan League:

Kyrgyzstan Cup:
Finalist: 2015
Quarterfinalist: 2013, 2014

Current squad

References

External links 
 FC Nashe Pivo at footballfacts.ru
 FC Nashe Pivo at weltfussballarchiv.com 
 FC Nashe Pivo  at football-guru.info

Football clubs in Kyrgyzstan
2003 establishments in Kyrgyzstan